Dominik Bammer (born 18 January 1990) is an Austrian handball player for Bregenz Handball and the Austrian national team.

References

1990 births
Living people
Austrian male handball players
Sportspeople from Linz